Guastalla is a town and comune in the province of Reggio Emilia in Emilia-Romagna, Italy.

Geography
Guastalla is situated in the Po Valley, and lies on the banks of the Po River.

History

The area of Guastalla was probably settled by Etruscans as early as the 7th century BCE, but the name of the city is mentioned for the first time in 864 CE. Of Lombard origin, the city was ruled by the Torelli family from 1406 to 1539, when it became the capital of a duchy under the Gonzaga family and housed artists like Guercino and Torquato Tasso.

In 1748, by the Treaty of Aix-la-Chapelle, the city became part of the Duchy of Parma, Piacenza e Guastalla, to which it belonged until 1847, when it was inherited by the Duke of Modena. Since the unification of Italy in 1861 Guastalla has been a part of Italy.

Industry 
SMEG (from Smalterie Metallurgiche Emiliane Guastalla), a major manufacturer of high-end domestic appliances, was founded by Vittorio Bertazzoni in Guastalla in 1948, where it still has its headquarters.

Main sights
Guastalla town:
The Cathedral (16th century) by Francesco da Volterra.
The Ducal Palace of Guastalla (1567).
The Civic Theatre Ruggero Ruggeri (1671).
The Town Hall.
The octagonal Oratory of Madonna della Concezione.
The church of Santa Maria dei Servi, designed by Francesco da Volterra. Noteworthy in the interior is a Deposition, canvas by Giuseppe Maria Crespi.
The Civic Tower (18th century), in the location where once was the Spanish Castle

Around Guastalla:
The Romanesque Oratory of St. George (probably from the 9th century).
The Basilica of St. Peter at Pieve di Guastalla, which was seat of two Roman Catholic councils. It houses an ancient baptismal font (9th century) and painted terracotta portraying the Madonna with Child, attributed to Guido Mazzoni.

Twin Towns
 Forcalquier, France
 Giovinazzo, Italy
 Gabicce Mare, Italy

Residents
  In-Grid, Italian pop-dance artist

See also
 County of Guastalla
 Duchy of Guastalla
 Rulers of Guastalla
 Diocese of Guastalla

References

 
Cities and towns in Emilia-Romagna
Populated places established in the 7th century BC